Gurnee is a surname. Notable people with the surname include:

Augustus C. Gurnee (1855–1926), American socialite and art patron;
Hal Gurnee (born 1935), American television director;
John D. Gurnee (1831–1906), American politician and lawyer;
Walter S. Gurnee (1813–1903), American politician.